The Final Sanction is a BBC Books original novel written by Steve Lyons and based on the long-running British science fiction television series Doctor Who. It features the Second Doctor, Zoe and Jamie. It was the last book in the series to use the "silver" version of the film logo.

Synopsis

It is the second and so far final encounter between the Doctor and the Selachians, first introduced by Lyons in his previous Second Doctor novel, The Murder Game. The year is 2204. The Doctor is caught in human history. When the TARDIS is stolen and Zoe is kidnapped by a Selachian he is forced to intervene in a war. The Doctor most make a painful choice which is more important the flow of a time stream or the lives of his companions.

References

External links

The Cloister Library - The Final Sanction

1999 British novels
1999 science fiction novels
Past Doctor Adventures
Second Doctor novels
Novels by Steve Lyons
Novels set in the 23rd century